Desmarestia ligulata is a species of brown algae found worldwide. Its common names include color changer, Desmarest's flattened weed, and sea sorrel, though the last name can also refer to other species of Desmarestia.

Habitat
This species is found between the low intertidal to subtidal zones on open coasts. It is the most abundant marine algae associated with giant kelp forests.

Acid accumulation
Desmarestia ligulata is known for its ability to accumulate high levels of sulfuric acid in its vacuoles. This accumulation appears to be active and permanent, occurring during cell growth and division while unaffected by light regimes or external nutrient profiles. It has been suggested that this acid accumulation is an evolutionary adaptation to discourage grazing by fish and invertebrates.

References

Desmarestiales
Taxa named by John Stackhouse